The Swedish Art Music Society is a non-profit organisation with the aim of publishing Swedish art music. It was founded by Swedish composers in 1859 to facilitate the publishing of Swedish art music, then largely controlled by German publishers.

Each year, one or a couple of pieces of music are selected for publication. Composers include Stenhammar, Röntgen-Maier, Alfvén, Olsson, de Frumerie, Wirén, Carlstedt and Welin. Often, contemporary music is chosen, but sometimes the organisation elects to publish older masterpieces which have remained unpublished, such as the recent publication of the symphonies by the Swedish 18th-century composer Eggert.

References

External links 
The society's webpage

Music organizations based in Sweden
Arts organizations established in 1859
Music publishing companies of Sweden
1859 establishments in Sweden